Otaro Alaka (born May 18, 1996) is an American football linebacker for the Arlington Renegades of the XFL. He played college football at Texas A&M.

College career
Alaka was a member of the Texas A&M Aggies for five seasons. He became a starter at linebacker midway through his freshman year and finished the season with 33 tackles including 3.5 tackles for loss. He suffered a season-ending injury three games into his sophomore year and used a medical redshirt. As a senior, Alaka led the Aggies with 79 tackles and 14.5 tackles for loss. Alaka finished his collegiate career with 276 tackles, 40 tackles for loss and 11 sacks in 53 games played with 45 starts.

Professional career

Baltimore Ravens
Alaka was signed by the Baltimore Ravens as an undrafted free agent on April 28, 2019. Olaka made the initial 53-man roster out of training camp, but was placed on injured reserve with a hamstring injury before appearing in any games on September 28, 2019.

Alaka was named to the Ravens' active roster out of training camp again in 2020. He made his professional debut in a 38–6 win against the Cleveland Browns. In Week 5 against the Cincinnati Bengals, Alaka suffered a season-ending knee injury and was placed on injured reserve on October 12, 2020.

On August 31, 2021, Alaka was waived/injured by the Ravens and placed on injured reserve.

Arlington Renegades
Alaka was selected by the Arlington Renegades in the 2023 XFL Draft. He was placed on the reserve list by the team on March 11, 2023.

Personal life
Both of his parents emigrated from Nigeria and are attorneys.

References

External links
 Texas A&M Aggies bio
 Baltimore Ravens bio

1996 births
Living people
American football linebackers
Players of American football from Houston
Texas A&M Aggies football players
Baltimore Ravens players
Arlington Renegades players
American sportspeople of Nigerian descent